"Wake Me Up" is a song recorded by South Korean girl group Twice. It is the group's third Japanese maxi single, featuring three other tracks. The song was pre-released as a digital single on April 25, 2018, and the CD single was released on May 16 by Warner Music Japan.

The single album surpassed 200,000 sales in its first week, first foreign artist in Japan to achieve for three consecutive release. It exceeded 500,000 shipments by May 28 and became the first single by a foreign female artist to be certified Double Platinum by the Recording Industry Association of Japan (RIAJ).

Background and release
On April 1, 2018, Twice announced the release of their third Japanese single titled "Wake Me Up", along with the news that Twice would appear in a television commercial for ABC-Mart and Nike Air Max. The commercial, featuring "Wake Me Up", began airing nationwide in Japan on April 5. The full song was first revealed on Tokyo FM's School of Lock! on April 24 and it was pre-released as a digital single on various online music portals the next day. The full music video was also released online on April 25.

Composition
"Wake Me Up" was composed by Atsushi Shimada, Louise Frick Sveen, and Albin Nordqvist, with lyrics written by Natsumi Watanabe. It was described as an upbeat dance song that "encourages people not to give up and keep going forward".

Music video
The full music video of "Wake Me Up" was uploaded online on April 24, 2018. It was directed by Jimmy of BS Pictures, the same team that produced Twice's previous music videos, "TT (Japanese ver.)" and "Brand New Girl".

It features the nine members portraying chic school girls and switching off between a variety of settings and outfits as the group sing and dance along to the upbeat song. The choreography was performed in athletic wear as Twice cheer on the listeners, with and without pompoms, and serve up Para Para-inspired dance moves. Unlike past videos that have featured social media-inspired elements, "Wake Me Up" gets a bit of an old-school treatment, with Chaeyoung looking at videos of the members on what appears to be one of the earliest Mac operating systems.

The music video ranked at No. 10 on 2018 YouTube's Top Trend Music Video in Japan, the third group's song on the list.

Promotion
"Wake Me Up" was first performed on Music Station on May 25, 2018. It was also performed during Twice 2nd Tour: Twiceland Zone 2 – Fantasy Park in Saitama and Osaka. On August 3, it was performed on a Music Station 2-hour special episode.

Commercial performance
The CD single debuted atop the daily ranking of Oricon Singles Chart with 129,275 units sold on its release day, breaking Twice's record of the highest first day sales for Korean girl groups in Japan. It topped the weekly Oricon Singles Chart with 262,658 copies sold, while debuted at number 14 with 5,939 downloads on Oricon Digital Singles Chart. It also topped the Billboard Japan recorded 299,195 unit sales from May 14–20, 2018. This is Twice's third consecutive release to surpass 200,000 sales in its first week, making the group the first foreign artist in Japan to achieve this.

It was also reported that "Wake Me Up" sold 471,438 copies in pre-orders, and it exceeded 500,000 shipments by May 28. On June 8, it became the first single by a foreign female artist to be certified Double Platinum by the RIAJ.

Track listing

Content production
Credits adapted from CD single liner notes.

Locations
 Recording
 JYPE Studios, Seoul, South Korea

 Mixing
 Mirrorball Studios, North Hollywood, California ("Wake Me Up")
 I to I Communications, Tokyo, Japan ("Pink Lemonade")

 Mastering
 Sterling Sound, New York City, New York

Personnel
 JYP Entertainment staff

 Song Ji-eun "Shannen" (JYP Entertainment Japan) – executive producer
 Jimmy Jeong (JYP Entertainment) – executive producer
 Cho Hae-sung (JYP Entertainment) – executive producer
 J. Y. Park "The Asiansoul" – producer
 Yasuhiro Suzuki (JYP Entertainment Japan) – strategic planning
 Rinko Narita (JYP Entertainment Japan) – A&R
 Lee Ji-hoon (JYP Entertainment Japan) – A&R
 Park Won (JYP Entertainment Japan) – A&R
 Kang Min-ju (JYP Entertainment Japan) – A&R
 Ayumi Saiki (JYP Entertainment Japan) – artist and fan marketing
 Lee Seong-ah (JYP Entertainment Japan) – artist and fan marketing
 Kim Sung-bub (JYP Entertainment Japan) – artist and fan marketing
 Hong Mina (JYP Entertainment Japan) – artist and fan marketing
 Miho Minaka (JYP Entertainment Japan) – artist and fan marketing
 Fuka Sudo (JYP Entertainment Japan) – artist and fan marketing
 Shin Hyun-kuk – Twice team
 Chung Hae-joon – Twice team
 Joo Bo-ra – Twice team
 Kim Hyo-yun – Twice team
 Shin Sae-rom – Twice team
 Kim Na-yeon – Twice team
 Yoo Jong-beom – Twice team
 Park Rae-chang – Twice team
 Jun Yong-jin – Twice team
 Yang Da-seol – Twice team
 Kwon Hyeok-jun – Twice team
 Jung Kyoung-hee (JYP Entertainment Japan) – administration
 Park Nam-yong (JYP Entertainment) – performance director
 Kim Hyung-woong (JYP Entertainment) – performance director
 Yun Hee-so (JYP Entertainment) – performance director
 Na Tae-hoon (JYP Entertainment) – performance director
 Yoo Kwang-yeol (JYP Entertainment) – performance director
 Kang Da-sol (JYP Entertainment) – performance director
 Lee Tae-sub (JYP Entertainment) – recording engineer
 Choi Hye-jin (JYP Entertainment) – recording engineer
 Eom Se-hee (JYP Entertainment) – recording engineer
 Lim Hong-jin (JYP Entertainment) – recording engineer
 Jang Han-soo (JYP Entertainment) – recording engineer
 Lee Jeong-yun "Lia" (JYP Publishing) – publishing
 Kim Min-ji (JYP Publishing) – publishing
 Shin Da-ye (JYP Publishing) – publishing
 Cho Hyun-woo (JYP Publishing) – publishing

 Warner Music Japan staff

 Kaz Kobayashi – executive producer
 Hayato Kajino – supervisor
 Rie Sawaoka – supervisor
 Yukiyasu "German" Fujii – chief A&R
 Toshio Kai – A&R
 Nao Fuse – A&R
 Norihiro Fukuda – A&R
 Himawari Fukuhara – A&R assistant
 Hidetsugu Sato – sales promotion
 Naoki Takami – digital planning and marketing
 Mamoru Fukumitsu – WMJ "JYP room"
 Han Gui-taek – WMJ "JYP room"
 Eom Eun-kyung – WMJ "JYP room"
 Hong Mina – WMJ "JYP room"
 Kim Jang-ho – WMJ "JYP room"
 Myoka Arai – WMJ "JYP room"
 Masayo Kuroda – product coordination
 Mizuho Makizaka – A&R secretary
 Shizuka Sato – A&R secretary

 Japanese recording staff
 Goei Ito (Obelisk) – music director
 Yu-ki Kokubo (Obelisk) – recording director
 Satoshi Sasamoto – Pro Tools operation

 Design staff

 Toshiyuki Suzuki (United Lounge Tokyo) – art direction
 Yasuhiro Ueda (United Lounge Tokyo) – design
 Tommy – photography
 Choi Hee-sun (F. Choi) - style director
 Seo Ji-eun (F. Choi) - style director
 Lee Ga-young (F. Choi) - style director
 Lee Jin-young (F. Choi) - assistant stylist
 Jeong In-yung (F. Choi) - assistant stylist
 Park Soo-young (F. Choi) - assistant stylist
 Park Jin-hee (F. Choi) - assistant stylist
 Han Jin-joo (F. Choi) - assistant stylist
 Jung Nan-young (Lulu Hair Makeup Studio) – hair director
 Choi Ji-young (Lulu Hair Makeup Studio) – hair director
 Son Eun-hee (Lulu Hair Makeup Studio) – hair director
 Jo Sang-ki (Lulu Hair Makeup Studio) – makeup director
 Jeon Dallae (Lulu Hair Makeup Studio) – makeup director
 Zia (Lulu Hair Makeup Studio) – makeup director
 Won Jung-yo (Bit&Boot) – makeup director
 Choi Su-ji (Bit&Boot) – assistant makeup director

 Movie staff
 Jimmy (BS Pictures) – music video director
 Han Gui-taek – music video making and jacket shooting making movie director
 Yu Yamaguchi (Warner Music Mastering) – DVD authoring

 Other personnel
 Atsushi Shimada – all instruments (on "Wake Me Up")
 Kohei Yokono – all instruments (on "Pink Lemonade")
 Twice – background vocals
 Ikuko Tsutsumi – background vocals
 Tony Maserati – mixing engineer (on "Wake Me Up")
 Naoki Yamada – mixing engineer (on "Pink Lemonade")
 Chris Gehringer – mastering engineer

Charts

Weekly charts

Year-end charts

Certifications

Accolades

References

2018 singles
2018 songs
J-pop songs
Japanese-language songs
Twice (group) songs
Warner Music Japan singles
Oricon Weekly number-one singles
Billboard Japan Hot 100 number-one singles